Perucca is an Italian surname. Notable people with the surname include:

 Ángel Perucca (1918–1981), Argentine footballer
 Eligio Perucca (1890–1965), Italian physics instructor and researcher

Italian-language surnames